Alabandite or alabandine is a rarely occurring manganese sulfide mineral. It crystallizes in the cubic crystal system with the chemical composition Mn2+S and develops commonly massive to granular aggregates, but rarely also cubic or octahedral crystals to 1 cm.

Etymology and History 
Alabandite was first described in 1784 by Franz-Joseph Müller von Reichenstein. The mineral name is derived from its supposed discovery locality at Alabanda (Aïdin) in Turkey.

Occurrence 
Alabandite forms in epithermal polymetallic sulfide veins and low-temperature manganese deposits. It occurs with acanthite, calcite, chalcopyrite, galena, pyrite, quartz, rhodochrosite, rhodonite, sphalerite and native tellurium. Sometimes it was found in meteorites.

Localities are several areas in Antarctica, Argentina, Armenia, Australia, Bolivia, Brazil, Bulgaria, Canada, China, Czech Republic, Finland, France, Germany, Ghana, Greece, Greenland, India, Italy, Japan, Kyrgyzstan, Mexico, New Zealand, Norway, Peru, Poland, Romania, Russia, Slovakia, South Africa, South Korea, Sweden, Switzerland, Taiwan, Tanzania, the United Kingdom, the US, Uzbekistan and Yemen. All together at present time approximately 220 discovery sites are registered.

Crystal structure 
Alabandite crystallizes in the cubic crystal system in the space group Fm3m with the lattice parameter a = 5.22 Å and four formula units per unit cell.

See also 
List of minerals

References 

Manganese(II) minerals
Sulfide minerals
Galena group
Cubic minerals
Minerals in space group 225